Alessandro Mazzi (born 16 November 1987) is an Italian former racing cyclist. He rode at the 2013 UCI Road World Championships.

Major results
2008
 1st Stage 1 Coupe des Nations Ville Saguenay
 4th Circuito Belvedere
 4th Trofeo Franco Balestra
 4th Gran Premio della Liberazione
 4th GP Ind.Com.Art di Castelfidardo
 6th GP Palio del Recioto
 7th Trofeo Piva
 9th Ronde van Vlaanderen U23
2011
 1st Trofeo Franco Balestra
2012
 7th Trofeo Edil C
2013
 1st  Mountains classification, Settimana Internazionale di Coppi e Bartali
2014
 3rd Overall Tour du Maroc
 3rd GP Czech Republic, Visegrad 4 Bicycle Race

References

External links
 

1987 births
Living people
Italian male cyclists
Cyclists from the Province of Verona